Qiantang District is a district in Hangzhou, the capital of Zhejiang Province in China. In August 2019, the Hangzhou Qiantang New Area, a provincial-level new area in Zhejiang established, and later has been transformed into a new area and integrated with the Hangzhou Economic and Technological Development Zone, a national-level development zone established in 1990. A district was established on April 9, 2021, with a total area of 531.7 square kilometers.

History 
1990: The Hangzhou Economic and Technological Development Zone was established.

April 1993: Approved by the State Council, Hangzhou Economic and Technological Development Zone was established as a national development zone.

May 1996: Xiasha Township was transferred from Yuhang City to Jianggan District.

October 1998: Xiasha Township was revoked and Xiasha Town was established.

April 2000: Hangzhou Export Processing Zone was established.

August 2000: Xiasha Higher Education Park was established.

2001: Jiangdong Industrial Park started to build.

2002: Qianjin Industrial Park began to build.

2002: Xiasha Town was revoked and Xiasha Subdistrict and Baiyang Subdistrict were established.

2003: Construction of Linjiang Industrial Park began.

2006: The three parks were officially established after approval.

2006: Qianjin Industrial Park was included in the city-level management and hosted by the Hangzhou Economic and Technological Development Zone.

2009: Dajiangdong "removed towns and established streets", adopted the operation mode of "integrating cities and streets, and leading streets with cities", and Jiangdong New Town and Linjiang New Town were officially listed.

September 9, 2011: Establishment of the Hangzhou Dajiangdong Industrial Cluster.

2015: The Dajiangdong Industrial Agglomeration Zone was included in the city-level management.

April 4, 2019: The Hangzhou Qiantang New Area was established, the Hangzhou Dajiangdong Industrial Cluster was disestablished, and three brands of the Hangzhou Economic and Technological Development Zone, the Zhejiang Hangzhou Export Processing Zone, and the Hangzhou Linjiang High-tech Industrial Development Zone were retained.

On October 23, 2019, Hangzhou's Qiantang New District and Jiaxing's Haining City signed a comprehensive strategic cooperation agreement, and Haining "Hanghai New District" was included in the strategic planning scope of Hangzhou Qiantang New District.

April 9, 2021: Qiantang District was established.

Science, education, culture and health 

 Secondary industry
 The new area has platforms and enterprises such as Hangzhou Medical Port Town, GAC Passenger Vehicle (Hangzhou) Company, Xizi Aviation Industry Company, and Global Research Center for Flexible Electronics and Intelligent Technology. New materials and other industries have market competitiveness.
 Education
 There are more than 60 schools of various types. Among them, there are 14 universities, 8 middle schools, 13 primary schools and 31 kindergartens.
 Xiasha Higher Education Park is the largest higher education park in Zhejiang Province, with 14 colleges and universities including Hangzhou Dianzi University, Zhejiang Sci-Tech University, Zhejiang Media Institute, Hangzhou Normal University, and 200,000 college students. Nearly 50,000 students graduate in the district each year.
 It has more than 80 provincial and ministerial key disciplines such as the Hangzhou Branch of the Institute of Physics and Chemistry of the Chinese Academy of Sciences, 187 master's and doctoral degrees, more than 20 national, provincial and ministerial key laboratories, and more than 100 natural science research institutions.
 Medical hygiene
 There are 66 health institutions of various types, including 2 Grade III Class A hospitals.

Evaluation 
Some media believe that the establishment of Qiantang New District can play the complementary role of Xiasha and Dajiangdong, and promote the integration of transportation and personnel between regions: Xiasha's university town can transport talents to Dajiangdong, and Dajiangdong Zeke relieves the land shortage in Xiasha and undertakes Xiasha. industrial transferand its also linked the establishment of the new district to Hangzhou's talent policy of allowing junior college students to settle in, pointing out that the two were prepared for Hangzhou to attract talents.

Transport

Metro
Line 1 (Hangzhou Metro): 7 stations
Line 8 (Hangzhou Metro): all stations on the Phase 1 of Line 8 is in Qiantang District

References 
 杭州市人民政府关于调整杭州市部分行政区划的通知

Quotes 

Economy of Hangzhou
Geography of Hangzhou
2021 establishments in China
Districts of Zhejiang
New areas (China)
States and territories established in 2021